"Try Try Try" is a song by the English singer-songwriter Julian Cope. It is the only single released in support of his album 20 Mothers.

Chart positions

References

1995 singles
1995 songs
Julian Cope songs
Songs written by Julian Cope
The Echo Label singles